Michael Cherry (born March 23, 1995) is an Olympic Athlete who specializes in the 400 meters. He was a member of the USA team in the 4 × 400 metres relay at the 2017 World Championships in Athletics in London, UK, placing second and receiving a silver medal.

He represented the United States at the 2020 Tokyo Summer Olympics, finishing 4th in the 400 meters and winning gold in the 4 x 400 meters relay, running first for the United States in the event final.

Competition record

References

External links

Living people
1995 births
American male sprinters
African-American male track and field athletes
World Athletics Championships medalists
World Athletics Championships athletes for the United States
Athletes (track and field) at the 2019 Pan American Games
Pan American Games silver medalists for the United States
Pan American Games medalists in athletics (track and field)
Pan American Games track and field athletes for the United States
World Athletics Championships winners
USA Indoor Track and Field Championships winners
World Athletics Indoor Championships medalists
Medalists at the 2019 Pan American Games
Athletes (track and field) at the 2020 Summer Olympics
Medalists at the 2020 Summer Olympics
Olympic gold medalists for the United States in track and field
Diamond League winners
21st-century African-American sportspeople
Florida State Seminoles men's track and field athletes
LSU Tigers track and field athletes